The Senate Judiciary Subcommittee on Immigration, Citizenship and Border Safety was one of six subcommittees within the Senate Judiciary Committee during the 114th Congress. The judiciary subcommittee on immigration is called the Subcommittee on Border Security and Immigration for the 116th Congress and was called Immigration, Refugees, and Border Security during the 113th Congress.

Jurisdiction
Jurisdiction: (1) Immigration, citizenship, and refugee laws; (2) Oversight of the Department of Homeland Security U.S. Citizenship and Immigration Services and the immigration functions of the U.S Customs and Border Protection, U.S. Immigration and Customs Enforcement, and Directorate of Border and Transportation Security; (3) Oversight of the immigration-related functions of the Department of Justice, the Department of State, the Department of Health and Human Services Office of Refugee Resettlement, and the Department of Labor; (4) Oversight of international migration and refugee laws and policy: and (5) Private immigration relief bills.

Members, 118th Congress

Historical subcommittee rosters

117th Congress

116th Congress

See also
United States House Judiciary Subcommittee on Immigration, Border Security, and Claims

References

External links
 Subcommittee on Immigration and the National Interest, official site
 Govtrack.us site on subcommittee

Judiciary Immigration